Organization Science is a bimonthly peer-reviewed academic journal published by the Institute for Operations Research and the Management Sciences. It covers research on the dynamics of organizations. In 2012, it was one of the four general-management journals listed by the University of Texas at Dallas when ranking universities by research. In 2016, the journal was ranked on the Financial Times top 45 list. The editor-in-chief is Gautam Ahuja (Cornell University). According to the Journal Citation Reports, the journal has a 2021 impact factor of 5.152.

References

External links

Publications established in 1990
Bimonthly journals
Business and management journals
INFORMS academic journals
English-language journals